AKA the Rugged Child is the debut studio album by American rapper Shyheim. It was released on April 19, 1994 via Virgin/EMI Records. Production was entirely handled by RNS, except for 1 song produced by RZA. It features guest appearances from GP Wu, Du-Lilz, Kwazi, Prophet and Kia Jeffries. The album peaked at #52 on the Billboard 200 and at #7 on Top R&B/Hip-Hop Albums in the United States. Its lead single, "On and On", peaked at #89 on the Billboard Hot 100 singles chart.

Track listing

Samples
"Here Come the Hits"
"Can I Get Some Help" by James Brown
"Harmony of the Underground" by Blue Mitchell
"On and On"
"Opus Pocus" by Jaco Pastorius
"Pass It Off"
"Don't Change Your Love" by Five Stairsteps
"You've Got It Bad" by Richard "Groove" Holmes
"One's 4 Da Money"
"Cristo Rendentor" by Donald Byrd
"Top Billin'" by Audio Two
"Blue Suede Shoes" by Carl Perkins
"Here I Am"
"Pain" by the Ohio Players
"Buckwylyn"
"Donkey Walk" by Lou Donaldson
"Just to Get a Rep" by Gang Starr
"You the Man"
"No Matter What Shape (Your Stomach's In)" by Booker T. & the M.G.'s
"Napsack"
"Wishin' and Hopin'" by Dusty Springfield
"Kool is Back" by Funk Inc.
"Crab Apple" by Idris Muhammad
"Microphone Fiend" by Eric B. & Rakim
"The Rugged Onez"
"In The Mood" by Leroy Hutson
"For Pete's Sake" by Pete Rock & CL Smooth
"Party's Goin' On"
"After Laughter (Come Tears)" by Wendy Rene

Charts

References

External links

Shyheim albums
1994 debut albums
Virgin Records albums
Albums produced by RZA